Kandahar District  or Dand District is situated in the central part of Kandahar Province, Afghanistan, surrounding the city of Kandahar. It borders Panjwai District to the west, Arghandab District to the north, Shah Wali Kot District to the northeast and Daman District to the east and south. The population is 468,200 (2006). The district center is the city of Kandahar.

History
In March 2009, the Dand District Centre was destroyed by a suicide bombing by two Taliban insurgents. In December 2009 it was rebuilt by the Department of Foreign Affairs and Canadian civilian police of the Kandahar Provincial Reconstruction Team. The construction project was one of two major initiatives undertaken by the Canadians – the other was in Tahkta Pul (southeast of Kandahar city).

Situated just outside the former Taliban capital Kandahar city, Dand was strategically important as a staging post for Taliban attackers intent on regaining their former stronghold.

Education 
The Dand district has 30 schools. Due to security concerns over half of the schools were closed down, but as of March 2011 all had reopened. Approximately 12,000 students attend the schools.

Governance 
The Dand District Chief is Ahmadullah Nazook. 
The number of national police in the district is 350.

Notes 
On some websites this district is shown as Dand District. Dand is now part of the city.

References 

AIMS District Map

Districts of Kandahar Province